A Turf Conspiracy may refer to:

 A Turf Conspiracy (novel), a 1916 novel by Nathaniel Gould
 A Turf Conspiracy (film), a 1918 film directed by Frank Wilson